Michael Scandizzo is the president and project lead of Castaway Entertainment, a company formed out of former Blizzard North employees in 2003. He is also responsible for programming on Diablo II, the development of the Battle.net game server network, and the Quake 2 mod Loki's Minions Capture the Flag. He also created the Boat Anchor comic strip: which describes events that mirror the time he would have spent at Blizzard North and the eventual formation of Castaway.

External links 
MobyGames credits
Bio on Castaway Entertainment

 

American chief executives
American computer programmers
Living people
Year of birth missing (living people)